"The Winter of Our Monetized Content" is the thirty-first season premiere of the American animated television series The Simpsons, and the 663rd episode overall. It aired in the United States on Fox on September 29, 2019. The director of the episode was Bob Anderson, and the writer was Ryan Koh.

The episode was dedicated to Rick and Morty and former Simpsons producer J. Michael Mendel who died of natural causes on September 22, 2019, one week before the season premiere.

Plot
At the Springfield Nuclear Power Plant, Homer, Lenny and Carl are watching Anger Watkins's sports commentary show when he asks who's better, LeBron James, Kobe Bryant, or Michael Jordan. When Homer calls the show and says John Stockton, Watkins insults Homer. Angry, Homer takes Marge's advice and starts his own internet sports show.

Bart interrupts the taping of Homer's show, causing the two of them to begin brawling. Their video goes viral on the internet and a hipster named Warburton Parker tells them he's going to teach them how to make better videos and become rich: monetizing. Their next video fight, sponsored by Buzz Cola, gets over 25 million views.

Making videos brings Homer and Bart closer. When they are filmed hugging each other, however, their popularity disappears. Parker attempts to organize a comeback where Bart and Homer would fight to the death, but they refuse at the last minute, ending their internet fame.

At Springfield Elementary, Lisa inadvertently starts a food fight and is given a week of detention. Due to budget cuts, Lindsey Naegle has privatized detention, encouraging punishment for minor infractions and putting the kids to work making novelty license plates. Lisa organizes a strike, shutting the operation down. Naegle then hires impoverished workers to replace them: the teachers.

Reception
Dennis Perkins of The A.V. Club gave the episode a B−, stating, "Well, here you go, Homer. 'The Winter of Our Monetized Content' has a few things going for it right out of the Season 31 gate. Clever title, as far as Simpsons title gags go. And John Mulaney is a fine get for the first guest star of the season. Apart from having the voice acting chops to spare at this point, his standup relies on a specificity of vocal style that makes for a memorable one-shot character in bespectacled hipster tech millionaire (billionaire?), the cleverly named Warburton Parker. The episode itself is standard mid-season Simpsons, free from the invariably forgettable 'Look at us!' stunt plotting of a lot of recent Simpsons season premieres."

Tony Sokol of Den of Geek rated this episode 3 out of 5 stars.

References

External links
 
 

2019 American television episodes
The Simpsons (season 31) episodes
Television episodes about Internet culture
Works about child labour